The 13483 / 13484 Farakka Express is an Express train belonging to Eastern Railway zone that runs between  and  in India. It is currently being operated with 13483/13484 train numbers on four days in a week basis.

Service

The 13483/Farakka Express has an average speed of 44 km/hr and covers 1464 km in 33h 30m. The 13484/Farakka Express has an average speed of 44 km/hr and covers 1464 km in 33h 30m.

Route and halts 

The important stops of the train are:

Coach composition

The train has standard ICF rakes with max speed of 110 kmph. The train consists of 21 coaches:

 1 AC II Tier
 2 AC III Tier
 9 Sleeper coaches
 1 Pantry car
 5 General
 2 Seating cum Luggage Rake

Traction

As the route is now fully electrified,both trains are hauled by a Howrah Loco Shed-based WAP-7 electric locomotive from Malda Town to Delhi and back.

Rake sharing

The train shares its rake with 13413/13414 Farakka Express (via Sultanpur)

See also 

 Malda Town railway station
 Delhi Junction railway station
 Farakka Express
 Malda Town–New Delhi Express

Notes

References

External links 

 13483/Farakka Express (via Faizabad)
 13484/Farakka Express (via Faizabad)

Transport in Delhi
Transport in Maldah
Named passenger trains of India
Rail transport in Jharkhand
Rail transport in Delhi
Rail transport in West Bengal
Rail transport in Bihar
Rail transport in Uttar Pradesh
Express trains in India